The XYZZY Awards are the annual awards given to works of interactive fiction, serving a similar role to the Academy Awards for film. The awards were inaugurated in 1997 by Eileen Mullin, the editor of XYZZYnews. Any game released during the year prior to the award ceremony is eligible for nomination to receive an award. The decision process takes place in two stages: members of the interactive fiction community nominate works within specific categories and sufficiently supported nominations become finalists within those categories. Community members then vote among the finalists, and the game receiving a plurality of votes is given the award in an online ceremony. 

Since 1997, the XYZZY Awards have become one of the most important events within the interactive fiction community. Together with events like the Interactive Fiction Competition and Spring Thing, the XYZZY Awards provide opportunities for the community to encourage and reward the creation and development of new works within a genre that is no longer commercially lucrative. 

The name of the awards comes from the magic word "xyzzy" causing teleportation from the popular early text adventure game Adventure.

Awards 

The awards have been presented in the following categories.

Best game
The game which is the most enjoyable as a whole; other awards recognize merit in particular qualities.

Best writing
A game which rises above the others in the quality of its descriptive text.

Best story
The game with the deepest or most original story.

Best setting
The most original or best-described locations.

Best puzzles
The most well-crafted, clever, and appropriate puzzles.

Best NPCs
Appropriate, amusing, and well-written casts of non-player characters.

Best individual puzzle
The most inspired, well-crafted, and intriguing puzzle.

Best individual NPC
A particularly well-implemented and well-written non-player character.

Best individual PC
A particularly well-defined and well-written player character. 

{{columns-list|colwidth=30em|
 1997: Tracy Valencia, in I-0 by Adam Cadre
 1998: The employee, in Little Blue Men by Michael Gentry
 1999: Primo Varicella, in Varicella by Adam Cadre
 2000: Rameses Alexander Moran, in Rameses by Stephen Bond
 2001: The Kissing Bandit, in The Tale of the Kissing Bandit by J. Robinson Wheeler
 2002: Pierre, in Savoir Faire by Emily Short
 2003: The player character in Episode in the Life of an Artist by Peter Eastman
 2004: Julia, in Sting of the Wasp by Jason Devlin
 2005: Wendy Little, in Tough Beans by Sara Dee
 2006: The player character in Delightful Wallpaper by Andrew Plotkin
 2007: Grunk, in Lost Pig by Admiral Jota
 2008: Hardy the Bulldog in Snack Time! by Renee Choba
 2009: Lottie Plum in Broken Legs by Sarah Morayati
 2010: Anthony Saint Germain in Death Off the Cuff by Simon Christiansen
 2011: Mentula Macanus in Mentula Macanus: Apocolocyntosis by Adam Thornton
 2012: Alexandra in Counterfeit Monkey by Emily Short
 2013: The Aqueosity in Coloratura by Lynnea Glasser
 2014: The PC in the uncle who works for nintendo by michael lutz
 2015: Bridget in Birdland by Brendan Patrick Hennessy
 2016: BEL/S in Open Sorcery by Abigail Corfman
 2017: Fred Strickland in Will Not Let Me Go by Stephen Granade
 2018: The Magpie in Alias 'The Magpie'  by J. J. Guest
 2019: Hazel Greene in Zozzled by Steph Cherrywell
 2020: The doppelganger in Doppeljobs by Lei
 2021: Marid in The Weight of a Soul by Chin Kee Yong
}}

Best use of medium
The category had no specific criteria given to voters; many chose to interpret this award as a recognition of particularly daring interpretations of the limits and abilities of interactive fiction,  especially as regards the relationship between the player, narrator, and player character.  This award was retired in 2010, when Best Implementation and Best Use of Innovation were introduced as replacements.

Best implementation
Introduced in 2010 along with Best Use of Innovation, to replace the Best use of Medium award. It recognizes "completeness of implementation, excellence in parser messages, etc".

Best use of innovation
Introduced in 2010 along with Best Implementation, to replace the Best use of Medium award. It recognizes the "most innovative game".

Best technological development
Recognizes "interpreters, authoring systems, libraries, utilities, and so on".

Best supplemental materials
Outstanding non-game content ("feelies") created to accompany specific games. Eligibility is based on the year when the supplemental materials were released, regardless of the year of release of the game.

 2010: Creating Interactive Fiction with Inform 7 (Aaron A. Reed)
 2011: PDFs and screencast tutorials for Kerkerkruip 
 2012: Feelies for Muggle Studies 
 2013: Multimedia – Dominique Pamplemousse''

Best use of multimedia

References

Further reading

External links
Xyzzy Awards
XYZZY Award Results 1996-2004 (with game files)

Fiction awards
Interactive fiction
Video game awards
Video game lists by reception or rating
Xyzzy awards for interactive fiction puzzles
XYZZY